Agnes Dusart (born 27 February 1962) is a former Belgian racing cyclist. She won the Belgian national road race title in 1986, 1987 and 1988. She also competed in the women's road race event at the 1988 Summer Olympics.

References

External links
 
 
 

1962 births
Living people
Belgian female cyclists
People from Tienen
Olympic cyclists of Belgium
Cyclists at the 1988 Summer Olympics
Cyclists from Flemish Brabant
20th-century Belgian women